Distemper is a Russian ska punk band from Moscow that was founded in 1989 and is also successful outside of Russia.

History
Distemper was founded on 4 September 1989 in Moscow. They started out as a hardcore punk band and released their first record 2 years after the band was founded, still not very successful. In 1992 Dazent joined as a singer, who gave the band his characteristic hoarse voice. In 1993 they released another album. With their 1995 record Город (City) they had integrated a brass section and their style shifted to ska punk.
They released 2 more albums and in 1998 they were already a widely known punk band in Russia and were the first known ska band in Russia.

Distemper are known for many good live performances. In 2002 they started going on tour in Europe and had many performances outside of Russia. By then they were also known in Germany and released Доброе утро (Good morning) on vinyl in Germany, which received excellent reviews. In 2003 they had a track on the sampler Russendisko-Hits and a growing fanbase, especially in Germany. They played 100 shows outside of Russia in the next 3 years and had performances on big Festivals like Force Attack (2005 and 2007) later on.

They received the Best Ska Band of Russia award in 2006 and their 2007 album Мир создан для тебя was nominated for the Rock Alternative Music Prize as album of the year.

Music
Distemper's music can be characterized by upbeat ska-punk. They mix fast and powerful punk rhythms with the danceable ska melodies. The hoarse voice of the Russian singer gives them a distinct sound. Today the line-up the band is made up of the usual drums, bass-guitar and  guitar, plus a brass section consisting of a trumpet and a trombone.

Discography
 1991: Мы сегодня с Баем (Today we're with Bai) (Sound Age Productions)
 1993: Ой ду-ду (Oi du-du) (Hobgoblin Rec.)
 1995: Город (City) (КТР Союз)
 1997: Face Control (Hobgoblin Rec.)
 1997: Внатуре! Алё!! Хорош!!! (Live) (Really! Hey!! Enough!!!) (Distemper Records)
 1999: Ну всё!.. (That's enough!) (Sound Age Productions)
 2000: Ска-панк шпионы (Ska-punk spies) (BRP Rec.)
 2001: Доброе утро (Good morning) (BRP Rec. / Distemper Records)
 2001: Hi! Good morning! (BRP Rec. / Distemper Records)
 2003: Нам по… ! (We don't give a… !)(BRP Rec. / Distemper Records)
 2003: Путеводитель по русскому року (The Russian rock guide) (BRP Rec.)
 2003: Distemper + The Know How (Split)
 2004: Ska Punk Moscow (BRP Rec.)
 2005: Подумай, кто твои друзья (Think who're your friends)
 2006: Distemper & Tarakany — Если парни объединятся ([what] If the guys unite)
 2006: Ну Всё! (Переиздание 1999) (That's enough! 1999 reissue)
 2007: Мир создан для тебя (The world's made for you)
 2008: My Underground
 2009: Всё или ничего (All or Nothing)
 2013: Гордость, вера, любовь (Pride, Faith, Love)

External links

 Official bandpage
 
 4 albums available for free at Jamendo
 Interview from 2004

1989 establishments in Russia
Musical groups established in 1989
Musical groups from Moscow
Russian hardcore punk groups
Russian rock music groups
Third-wave ska groups
Soviet punk rock groups